Rising Star Casino Resort (previously the Grand Victoria Casino & Resort) is a riverboat casino and hotel in Rising Sun, Indiana, USA, owned and operated by Full House Resorts.

History
The Indiana Gaming Commission in June 1995 selected a Hyatt-affiliated project in Rising Sun to receive a riverboat gaming license.

The Grand Victoria II casino opened in October 1996.

The Grand Victoria opened a 200-room hotel and an entertainment pavilion in July 1997, with a grand opening ceremony hosted by Robin Leach and Rich Little.

Hyatt decided in 2006 to sell the Grand Victoria. In 2011, Full House Resorts purchased the property for $43 million, and renamed it as the Rising Star Casino Resort.

A second hotel with 104 rooms, the $8-million North Star Tower, was opened at the site in December 2013.

In 2021 Rising Star partnered with WynnBET to launch a mobile betting platform, which partnered with the Cincinnati Reds to make team promotions available to users.

See also
 List of casinos in Indiana

References

Buildings and structures in Ohio County, Indiana
Casinos in Indiana
Casino hotels
Riverboat casinos